Clive Bonas Simmons  (born 3 April 1933) is a retired Venezuelan track athlete. He competed at the 1956 Olympics in the 100 m and 4 × 100 m sprint and at the 1960 Olympics in the long jump and 4 × 100 m sprint. His best achievement was fifth place in 1960 in the sprint relay, in which he also won two silver medals at the 1955 and 1959 Pan American Games.

References

External links
 

1933 births
Living people
Venezuelan male sprinters
Olympic athletes of Venezuela
Athletes (track and field) at the 1956 Summer Olympics
Athletes (track and field) at the 1960 Summer Olympics
Pan American Games silver medalists for Venezuela
Athletes (track and field) at the 1955 Pan American Games
Athletes (track and field) at the 1959 Pan American Games
Pan American Games medalists in athletics (track and field)
Central American and Caribbean Games gold medalists for Venezuela
Competitors at the 1959 Central American and Caribbean Games
Central American and Caribbean Games medalists in athletics
Medalists at the 1955 Pan American Games
Medalists at the 1959 Pan American Games